Khawaja Najmul Hassan is a prominent television producer/director and one of the pioneers of television in Pakistan since television was first introduced in the country in 1964.

Early life and education
He got his education from Cathedral School and Government College, Lahore.

Career
Khawaja Najmul Hassan joined Pakistan Television Corporation (PTV) in 1974.  At that time, Aslam Azhar was the managing director of PTV, Lahore Centre. Khawaja's college friend Shoaib Hashmi introduced him to Aslam Azhar.

Later in his career, Khawaja Najmul Hassan served as the Director Programs and then General Manager of PTV Lahore Centre in 2003.

Muneeza Hashmi, who worked for a long time with Khawaja Najmul Hassan at PTV Lahore Center,  stated that he was a responsible and trustworthy person. Many people at the event agreed that he was an inspirational figure for the new upcoming TV artists and discovered many talented stars and groomed them over the years.

Well-known Pakistani singer Tina Sani said at an event, "I owe a lot to Khawaja sb for making my career. We would feel protected and perform live with ease in his presence. He would not allow anything to go on air that could damage the career or image of the artist".

Khawaja Najmul Hassan helped promote the careers of and worked with many noted Pakistani artists including Malika Pukhraj, Roshan Ara Begum, Iqbal Bano, Mehdi Hassan, Farida Khanum, Abida Parveen, Musarrat Nazir and Nusrat Fateh Ali Khan.

Producer of PTV shows
 Taal Matol with Shoaib Hashmi (1975)
 Dastan Go (story tellers) (1977 - 1979)
 Tansen (docudrama on the classical music maestro Tansen)
 Sukhanwar (PTV musical TV show) (1972 - 1975)
 Saaz Kahani (story of dying musical instruments like Sarangi)
 Tarannum musical series with Noor Jehan (1978)
 Mauseeqar (tributes to Pakistani film music directors) (1979)
 Sur Ka Safar musical series with Malika Pukhraj and Tahira Syed
 Meri Pasand (musical TV series) (1982 - 1984)
  Traditional wedding songs series with Musarrat Nazir (1985 - 1986)
 Moods and Melodies (PTV musical show) (1989)
 Chilman (traditional wedding songs with singers Saira Nasim, Shabnam Majeed, Tahira Syed, Arifa Siddiqui and Fariha Pervez) (1999)
 Khiraj-e-Tehseen (tributes to Pakistani legendary figures) (2006)
 Raat Gaye (PTV musical show) (2006)

Book launched
At a special event at Islamabad to launch a book about 'the golden era' of state-run Pakistan Television Corporation (PTV) in 2019, many prominent personalities gathered here from the broadcasting world including Fouzia Saeed, Uxi Mufti, Kanwal Naseer, Nayyar Kamal, Muneeza Hashmi and Laila Zuberi. This book is titled Stars from Another Sky – it is a story of over 35 years' journey in the broadcasting world of Khawaja Najmul Hassan who is widely considered to be a television star maker and producer of the most popular TV shows ever produced in Pakistan.

Noted Pakistani TV writer and playwright Haseena Moin has written the foreword of this book.

Awards and recognition
 Pride of Performance Award by the President of Pakistan in 2005.

References

External links

50 delightful years: Thank you PTV Dawn (newspaper)

1951 births
Pakistani television producers
Pakistani television directors
Pakistan Television Corporation executives
Government College University, Lahore alumni
Recipients of the Pride of Performance
Living people
Pakistani people of Kashmiri descent